The 2022 Korea Open (also known for sponsorship purposes as the 2022 Eugene Korea Open Tennis Championships for the men's tournament and the 2022 Hana Bank Korea Open for the women's tournament) was a combined ATP Tour and WTA Tour tennis tournament took place at the Olympic Park Tennis Center in Seoul, South Korea on outdoor hard courts from 19 to 25 September 2022 for the women and from 26 September to 2 October 2022 for the men. It was the 18th edition of the women's tournament, and the first edition of the men's tournament since 1996. The tournament was a WTA 250 event on the 2022 WTA Tour (after being a WTA 125 level tournament in 2021), and a ATP Tour 250 event on the 2022 ATP Tour after several tournaments in China were cancelled because of the ongoing COVID-19 pandemic.

Champions

Men's singles

  Yoshihito Nishioka def.  Denis Shapovalov 6–4, 7–6(7–5)

This is Nishioka's first title of the season and the second of his career.

Women's singles

  Ekaterina Alexandrova def.  Jeļena Ostapenko 7–6(7–4), 6–0

This is Alexandrova's second title of the season and third of her career.

Men's doubles

  Raven Klaasen /  Nathaniel Lammons def.  Nicolás Barrientos /  Miguel Ángel Reyes-Varela 6–1, 7–5

Women's doubles

  Kristina Mladenovic /  Yanina Wickmayer def.  Asia Muhammad /  Sabrina Santamaria 6–3, 6–2

ATP singles main draw entrants

Seeds 

 Rankings are as of 19 September 2022.

Other entrants 
The following players received wildcards into the singles main draw:
  Hong Seong-chan
  Nam Ji-sung
  Kaichi Uchida

The following players received entry from the qualifying draw:
  Chung Yun-seong
  Nicolás Jarry
  Yosuke Watanuki
  Wu Tung-lin

The following players received entry as lucky losers:
  Aleksandar Kovacevic
  Shintaro Mochizuki
  Hiroki Moriya
  Ryan Peniston

Withdrawals 
 Before the tournament
  Borna Ćorić → replaced by  Hiroki Moriya
  Taylor Fritz → replaced by  Shintaro Mochizuki
  Cristian Garín → replaced by  Emilio Gómez
  Marcos Giron → replaced by  Ryan Peniston
  Brandon Nakashima → replaced by  Aleksandar Kovacevic
  Frances Tiafoe → replaced by  Tseng Chun-hsin
  Jiří Veselý → replaced by  Taro Daniel
  Alexander Zverev → replaced by  Radu Albot

ATP doubles main draw entrants

Seeds

 Rankings are as of 19 September 2022

Other entrants
The following pairs received wildcards into the doubles main draw:
  Chung Hyeon /  Kwon Soon-woo
  Nam Ji-sung /  Song Min-kyu

The following pair received entry as alternates:
  Radu Albot /  Tseng Chun-hsin

Withdrawals
  Matthew Ebden /  John Peers → replaced by  Miomir Kecmanović /  John Peers
  Marcos Giron /  Mackenzie McDonald → replaced by  Radu Albot /  Tseng Chun-hsin

WTA singles main draw entrants

Seeds 

 Rankings are as of 12 September 2022.

Other entrants 
The following players received wildcards into the singles main draw:
  Jeong Bo-young
  Han Na-lae
  Park So-hyun

The following players received entry using a protected ranking into the singles main draw:
  Kimberly Birrell
  Eugenie Bouchard
  Yanina Wickmayer

The following players received entry from the qualifying draw:
  Back Da-yeon
  Lizette Cabrera
  Jana Fett
  Ankita Raina
  Astra Sharma
  Lulu Sun

The following player received entry as a lucky loser:
  Victoria Jiménez Kasintseva

Withdrawals 
 Before the tournament
  Katie Boulter → replaced by  Anna Blinkova
  Aleksandra Krunić → replaced by  Priscilla Hon
  Evgeniya Rodina → replaced by  Yanina Wickmayer
  Katie Swan → replaced by  Victoria Jiménez Kasintseva

WTA doubles main draw entrants

Seeds 

 1 Rankings as of 12 September 2022.

Other entrants
The following pairs received wildcards into the doubles main draw:
  Choi Ji-hee /  Park So-hyun
  Kim Da-bin /  Ku Yeon-woo

References 

2022 ATP Tour
2022 WTA Tour
2022 in South Korean sport
2020s in Seoul
Korea Open (tennis)
September 2022 sports events in South Korea
October 2022 sports events in South Korea